Dany Bouchard (born 19 September 1967) is a Canadian former cross-country skier who competed in the 1992 Winter Olympics and in the 1994 Winter Olympics.

References

1967 births
Living people
Canadian male cross-country skiers
Olympic cross-country skiers of Canada
Cross-country skiers at the 1992 Winter Olympics
Cross-country skiers at the 1994 Winter Olympics